Rock Harbour is a local service district and designated place in the Canadian province of Newfoundland and Labrador. It is east of Marystown on Placentia Bay.

History 
Rock Harbour had a population of 149 with 40 households in 1921 and 142 in 1956. The population as of the 2011 Canada census was 66.

Geography 
Rock Harbour is in Newfoundland within Subdivision D of Division No. 2.

Demographics 

Economy 
A major employer at one point was a nearby fish processing plant operated by FPI then OCI (closed as of 2011) in Marystown and at the Peter Kiewit and Sons Marystown and Cow Head Facilities, but most of the population rely on work elsewhere in the province and country working as skilled tradespersons.

Government 
Rock Harbour is a local service district (LSD) that is governed by a committee responsible for the provision of certain services to the community. The chair of the LSD committee is Clyde Hooper.

See also 
List of communities in Newfoundland and Labrador
List of designated places in Newfoundland and Labrador
List of local service districts in Newfoundland and Labrador

References 

Populated coastal places in Canada
Designated places in Newfoundland and Labrador
Local service districts in Newfoundland and Labrador
Populated places in Newfoundland and Labrador
Tourism in Newfoundland and Labrador